Krzysztof Rogowski (born 7 July 1981) is a featherweight professional boxer from Poland who won a bronze medal at the 2006 European Union Championships.

References

External links

1981 births
Living people
Polish male boxers
Sportspeople from Poznań
Featherweight boxers